

France
 Mauritius – François Louis Magallon de la Morlière, Governor of Mauritius (1800–1803)

Netherlands
 Dutch East Indies
 Pieter Gerardus van Overstraten, Governor General of the Dutch East Indies (1796–1801)
 Johannes Siberg, Governor-General of the Dutch East Indies (1801–1805)

Ottoman Empire
 Principality of Abkhazia – Kelesh Begi (1789–1806)
 Oran – Osman Bey, Wali of Oran (1799–1802)

Portugal
 Angola – Miguel António de Melo, Governor of Angola (1797–1802)
 Macau – Jose Manuel Pinto, Governor of Macau (1800–1803)
 Moçambique, Zambezi and Sofala –
 Francisco Guedes de Carvalho Meneses da Costa, Governor of the Colony of Moçambique, Zambezi and Sofala (1797–1801)
 Isidro de Sousa e Sá, Governor of the Colony of Moçambique, Zambezi and Sofala (1801–1805)

Spanish Empire
Viceroyalty of New Granada – Pedro Mendinueta y Múzquiz (1797–1803)
Viceroyalty of New Spain – Félix Berenguer de Marquina (1800–1803)
Captaincy General of Cuba – Salvador de Muro y Salazar, Governor of Cuba (1799–1812)
Spanish East Indies – Rafael María de Aguilar y Ponce de León, Governor-General of the Philippines (1793–1806)
Commandancy General of the Provincias Internas – Pedro da Nava, Commandant General of the Interior Provinces (1793–1802)
Viceroyalty of Peru –
Ambrosio O'Higgins (1796–1801)
Manuel Arredondo y Pelegrín, Dean of the Audencia and acting Viceroy of Peru (1801)
Gabriel de Avilés (1801–1806)
Captaincy General of Chile –
 Joaquín del Pino y Rozas, Royal Governor of Chile (1799–1801)
 José de Santiago Concha Jiménez Lobatón, Royal Governor of Chile (1801)
 Francisco Tadeo Diez de Medina Vidanges, Royal Governor of Chile (1801–1802)
Viceroyalty of the Río de la Plata –
Gabriel de Avilés (1799–1801)
Joaquín del Pino y Rozas (1801–1804)

United Kingdom
 Bahamas –
William Dowdeswell, Governor of the Bahamas (1797–1801)
John Halkett, Governor of the Bahamas (1801–1804)*#
 Barbados – William Bishop, Acting Governor of Barbados (1800–1801)
 Bermuda – George Beckwith, Governor of Bermuda (1798–1803)
 Canada – Robert Milnes, Governor-General of the Canadas (1799–1805)
 Cayman Islands – William Bodden, Chief Magistrate of the Cayman Islands (1776–1823)
 Ceylon – Frederick North, Governor of Ceylon (1798–1805)
 Grenada
 Charles Green, Governor of Grenada (1797–1801)
 Samuel Dent, Acting Governor of Grenada (1801–1802)
 Jamaica –
Alexander Lindsay, 6th Earl of Balcarres, Governor of Jamaica (1795–1801)
George Nugent, Governor of Jamaica (1801–1805)
 Madras – Edward Clive, Governor of Madras (1798–1803)
 Colony of Newfoundland – Charles Pole, Commodore-Governor of Newfoundland (1800–1801)
 Malta Protectorate
 Alexander Ball, Civil Commissioner of Malta (1799–1801)
 Henry Pigot, Civil Commissioner of Malta (1801)
 Charles Cameron, Civil Commissioner of Malta (1801–1802)
 New South Wales – Philip Gidley King, Governor of New South Wales (1800–1806)

Colonial governors
Colonial governors
1801